William Younghusband (1819 – 5 May 1863), sometimes known as "William Younghusband junior", was a businessman and politician in the colony of South Australia; one of the promoters of the Murray River Steam Navigation Company, which enabled Captain Cadell in 1853 to win the £4000 bonus offered by the Government of South Australia for the initiation of steam communication on the Murray.

Business
In 1845, he and George Young founded a woolbroking and shipping business "William Younghusband, jun. & Co.", with offices in Gilbert Street, Adelaide. The company was wound up in 1867.

Political career
Having represented Stanley in the mixed South Australian Legislative Council for five years prior to the inauguration of responsible government in 1856, he was elected to the new Legislative Council, and was Chief Secretary in the Hanson Government from September 1857 to May 1860. This being the first stable administration formed subsequent to the disappearance of the old officials from public life, it fell to Mr. Younghusband to organise the various Government departments inaugurated under the new régime. This he did with consummate ability, and for many years the public business of the colony was transacted on the lines he laid down. Mr. Younghusband was a director of the Bank of Australasia, and retired from the Legislative Council by rotation in Feb. 1861. He died at Rome on 5 May 1863.

Legacy
Younghusband Peninsula and the small town Younghusband on the River Murray are named after him.

References

 

|-

1819 births
1863 deaths
Members of the South Australian Legislative Council
19th-century Australian politicians
19th-century Australian businesspeople